Heike Thoms (born 1 November 1968) is a German former professional tennis player.

Thoms started on tour in the late 1980s and reached a best singles ranking of 128 in the world. She made the second round of the 1988 German Open and also twice reached the second round in Hamburg.

ITF finals

Singles: 12 (6–6)

Doubles: 7 (2–5)

References

External links
 
 

1968 births
Living people
West German female tennis players
German female tennis players